Ntombezinhle Jiyane (born ) is a South African DJ, producer, media personality and businesswoman, who is better known by her stage name DJ Zinhle.

Zinhle has also pursued an acting career. She made her on-screen debut as judge in Jika MaJika, Idols South Africa, Turn It On, and 1's and 2 (2021)  and appeared as a guest on the television series  eKasi: Our Stories (2011), Play Your Part (2012), Tropika Island (2012), The Close Up, and Rhythm City.

Early life
Ntombezinhle Jiyane was born in Dannhauser, KwaZulu-Natal. After leaving Dannhauser, she went to stay in Newcastle, and studied at Siyamukela High School in Emadadeni, Newcastle.

Career
DJ Zinhle started her career around 2004. Initially, she wanted to be a TV presenter and never had any aspirations of being a DJ, until her brother's passion for mixing vinyls rubbed off on her and her love and passion for being a DJ grew. She got her first break as a resident DJ on a youth dance show called Jika Majika that aired on SABC 1.

She worked with South African music icon Boom Shaka on the album I Put It In, which featured other notable artists like Dr Malinga, Khanyi Mbau, Mphoza, and many more. She headlined the Sisters with Soul concert along with Amanda Black. At the  second  ceremony of Mzansi Kwaito and House Music Awards, she won two awards including; Best House DJ and Best House Female Artist.  Zinhle also headlined the Zimfest 2019 live concert, a Zimbabwean festival held in England. Her 2019 hit single  "Umlilo" gained 5.1 million streams in just three months, and certified  3× platinum by the Recording industry of South Africa 
(RISA) and it was also voted as 2019's Song of The Year. DJ Zinhle was chosen as the headline act for the inaugural Red Bull Music Experience in Cape Town.

In 2021, she co-hosted talent show competition on Sabc 1 called 1's and 2's alongside DJ Tira and DJ Speedsta. Towards the end of 2021, she announced Unexpected her upcoming reality show which will be premiered on BET Africa.

Filmography

Television

Accolades

 SAMA 19 and 12th Metro FM Awards Song of the Year nominee.
 Named one of South Africa's Top 10 most influential women in Bona magazine.
 Named one of 21 Most powerful African women by Oprah magazine.
 Channel 24 named her as the 4th most powerful celebrity in South Africa.
 Glamour magazine's Woman of the Year.
 Launched the women empowerment TV series It Takes a Village.
 In late 2019, she was named as the Top Female DJ in Africa for the 2nd year in a row.
 On 7 March 2020, she won the Forbes Woman Africa Entertainer Award.
 She was announced as Africas number 1 female DJ on DjaneTop list of 2021.

Awards and nominations

Personal life
DJ Zinhle was in an on and off relationship with South African rapper AKA, until their split in January 2020.
She and AKA have one child together. In 2021, she gave birth to a baby girl with her husband Bongani, also known as Murdah Bongz.

References

External links 
  
 

South African DJs
Women DJs
1982 births
People from Newcastle, KwaZulu-Natal
Living people